I'm Alright may refer to:

 I'm Alright (Loudon Wainwright III album), 1985
 I'm Alright (Jo Dee Messina album), 1998
 "I'm Alright" (Jo Dee Messina song), this album's title track
 "I'm Alright" (Kenny Loggins song)", from the Caddyshack soundtrack, 1980
 I'm Alright (Lynn Anderson album), 1970
""I'm Alright" (Lynn Anderson song), a song by Lynn Anderson from the album of the same name
 "I'm Alright", a song by Jars of Clay from their album If I Left the Zoo
 "I'm Alright", a song by Luna Halo from their self-titled album
 "I'm Alright", a song by the band Stereophonics from the album You Gotta Go There to Come Back
 "I'm Alright", a song by Simon Townshend from the album Animal Soup
 "I'm Alright", a song by Shania Twain from the album Now
 "I'm Alright", a song by Sugababes from The Lost Tapes
 "I'm All Right", a 2006 song by Madeleine Peyroux from the album Half the Perfect World
 "I'm All Right" (Bo Diddley song), on his 1963 album Bo Diddley's Beach Party, covered by The Rolling Stones as "I'm Alright" on their EP Got Live If You Want It!

Others
 I'm Alright Jack & the Beanstalk, the alternate title for Not of This Earth, an album by The Damned
 I'm All Right Jack, a 1959 British comedy film
 "I'm All Right Jack", a song by the Tom Robinson Band on the 1978 album Power in the Darkness

See also
It's Alright (disambiguation)